Chornyi Ostriv is an urban-type settlement in the Khmelnytskyi Raion (district) of Khmelnytskyi Oblast (province) in western Ukraine. It hosts the administration of Chornyi Ostriv settlement hromada, one of the hromadas of Ukraine. The town's population was 924 as of the 2001 Ukrainian Census and 

Chornyi Ostriv was first founded in 1366, and it received the Magdeburg rights in 1556. Since 1957, it has the status of an urban-type settlement.

People from Chornyi Ostriv
 Aleksander Narcyz Przezdziecki (1814-1871), Polish historian
 Karol Dominik Przezdziecki (1782-1832), Polish count

References

Urban-type settlements in Khmelnytskyi Raion
Populated places established in the 14th century
Proskurovsky Uyezd